Palaeoephippiorhynchus is an extinct genus of large stork from the Oligocene of Africa: its closest living relative is the Saddle-billed stork.

References

 Mlíkovský, J. 2003. Early Miocene birds of Djebel Zelten, Libya. J. Nat. Mus., Nat. Hist. Ser. 172: (1–4):114–120.
 Rasmussen, T.; Olson, S. L. & Simons, E. L. 1987. Fossil birds from Oligocene Jebel Qatrani Formation, Fayum Province, Egypt. Smithsonian Contributions for Paleobiology 62: 1–19.

Ciconiidae
Cenozoic birds of Africa
Oligocene birds
Miocene birds
Fossil taxa described in 1930
Storks